Purviance is a surname. Notable people with the surname include:
 David Purviance (1766–1847), American state legislator in Kentucky and Ohio 
 Douglas Purviance (born 1952), American jazz musician
 Edna Purviance (1895–1958), American actress
 Samuel Anderson Purviance (1809–1882), U. S. Representative from Pennsylvania
 Samuel Dinsmore Purviance (1774–1806), U. S. Representative from North Carolina
 William Alexander Purviance (1788–1857), American state legislator in Pennsylvania